Harry William Malmberg (July 31, 1925 – October 29, 1976) was an American second baseman and coach in Major League Baseball, and a longtime player and manager in minor league baseball.

Malmberg spent only three seasons at the Major League level during a 29-year career in professional baseball. Originally a member of the Cleveland Indians farm system, he reached Triple-A with the San Diego Padres of the Pacific Coast League in 1951, and spent the 11 of the next 12 years at the top level of the minors, toiling also for the Indianapolis Indians, Charleston Senators and Minneapolis Millers of the American Association, and the PCL's San Francisco Seals and Seattle Rainiers. The exception was the 1955 season, when Malmberg, turning age 30, spent a full season for the Detroit Tigers, appearing in 67 games, and compiling a batting average of .216 with five doubles, two triples, no home runs and 19 runs batted in.

Malmberg played in the Boston Red Sox farm system in 1957–58, and rejoined it when the Red Sox took over as the Seattle Rainiers' parent club in 1961. Malmberg served as a playing coach for Rainiers manager Johnny Pesky, who was promoted to pilot of the Red Sox following the  season. Malmberg followed Pesky to Boston as his first-base coach for the 1963 and 1964 seasons. After Pesky's firing at the end of 1964, Malmberg embarked on an 11-year minor league managerial career in the Baltimore Orioles, Kansas City Royals and Oakland Athletics organizations. He managed teams in the Class A California League, Florida State League and Carolina League, the Double-A Eastern League and Southern League, and the Triple-A American Association. He won two league championships (in 1965 and 1971) and retired after the 1975 campaign with a career managerial mark of 744 wins and 783 defeats (.487).

But Malmberg was suffering from terminal pancreatic cancer and he died in San Francisco at age 51, five months before the Mariners played their first official game.

References
 Johnson, Lloyd, and Wolff, Miles, ed., The Encyclopedia of Minor League Baseball, 2nd edition. Durham, N.C.: Baseball America, 2007.

External links

1925 births
1976 deaths
Bakersfield Indians players
Baseball players from Alabama
Boston Red Sox coaches
Charleston Senators players
Deaths from cancer in California
Deaths from pancreatic cancer
Detroit Tigers players
Harrisburg Senators players
Indianapolis Indians players
Major League Baseball first base coaches
Major League Baseball second basemen
Minneapolis Millers (baseball) players
Minor league baseball managers
Oklahoma City Indians players
People from Pittsburg, California
San Diego Padres (minor league) players
San Francisco Seals (baseball) players
Seattle Rainiers players